are Japanese residents or citizens of sub-Saharan African ancestry.

History 

In the mid-16th century, Africans arrived in Japan alongside Europeans as crew members and slaves.

Yasuke, an African man, possibly from Mozambique, arrived in Japan in the late-16th century alongside Jesuit missionary Alessandro Valignano. He found favor with Oda Nobunaga, the daimyō and warlord, and ultimately became his retainer.

After WW2, with the Japanese economic miracle, many students from Africa began coming to Japan often to pursue relevant postgraduate education through MEXT and JICA. African Americans also joined the JET Programme to work as English teachers. Some African Americans arrive to serve in the United States Forces Japan.

In 2015, Ariana Miyamoto, who was born in Japan to a Japanese mother and an African-American father, became the first  (meaning “mixed”) contestant to win the title of Miss Universe Japan. The decision to allow Miyamoto to win the title, due to her not being fully Japanese ethnically, was controversial.

Individuals

Japan-born
 Thelma Aoyama (born 1987), R&B singer of Afro-Trinidadian descent
 Kashif Bangnagande (born 2001), footballer of Ghanaian descent
 Abdul Hakim Sani Brown (born 1999), sprinter of Ghanaian descent
 Rui Hachimura (born 1998), basketball player of Beninese descent
 Dan Howbert (born 1987), footballer of Liberian descent
 Crystal Kay (born 1986), pop singer of African American descent
 Issey Maholo (born 1985), football goalkeeper of Congolese descent
 Ariana Miyamoto (born 1994), beauty contestant of African American descent
 Mana Nakao (born 1986), footballer of Tanzanian descent
 Talla Ndao (born 1999), footballer of Senegalese descent
 Karen Nun-Ira (born 1991),  of Ghanaian descent
 Naomi Osaka (born 1997), tennis player of Haitian descent
 Ado Onaiwu (born 1995), footballer of Nigerian descent
 Evelyn Mawuli (born 1995), basketball player of Ghanaian descent
 Stephanie Mawuli (born 1998), basketball player of Ghanaian descent
 Powell Obinna Obi (born 1997), footballer of Nigerian descent
 Randy Emeka Obi (born 1999), footballer of Nigerian descent
 Richard T. Jones (born 1972), actor of American descent
 Leo Kokubo (born 2001), footballer of Nigerian descent
 Keita Buwanika (born 2002), footballer of Ugandan descent
 Anrie Chase (born 2004), footballer of Jamaican descent
 Jefferson Tabinas (born 1998), Japanese footballer of Ghanaian descent
 Paul Tabinas (born 2002), footballer of Ghanaian descent
 Solomon Sakuragawa (born 2001), footballer of Nigerian descent
 Joel Chima Fujita (born 2002), footballer of Nigerian descent
 Zachary Herivaux (born 1996), footballer of Haitian descent

Foreign-born
 Asuka Cambridge (born 1993), Jamaica-born Japanese sprinter
 Pape Mour Faye (born 1986), Senegal-born Japanese professional basketball player
 Samba Faye (born 1987), Senegal-born Japanese professional basketball player
 Chris Hart (born 1984), US-born Japanese pop singer
 Kotaro Matsushima (born 1993), South Africa-born Japanese rugby union player
 Kaoru Mfaume (born 1976), US-born entertainment producer
 Ike Nwala (born 1986), US-born TV presenter and comedian
 Andy Ologun (born 1983), Nigeria-born professional boxer, mixed martial artist, kickboxer, and actor
 Bobby Ologun (born 1973), Nigeria-born television personality
 Mandy Sekiguchi (born 1991), US-born rapper
 Jelani Reshaun Sumiyoshi (born 1997), US-born footballer
 Zion Suzuki (born 2002), US-born footballer
 Jerome White, Jr. (born 1981), or Jero, US-born  singer
 Yasuke, Africa-born retainer of Oda Nobunaga

References 

Ethnic groups in Japan
 
Japan
Race in Japan